Adam Seybert (May 16, 1773 – May 2, 1825) represented Pennsylvania in the U.S. House of Representatives from October 10, 1809, to March 3, 1815.

Adam Seybert was born in Philadelphia, Pennsylvania.  He completed the medical course at the University of Pennsylvania at Philadelphia in 1793 and continued studies in Europe, where he attended schools in Edinburgh, Göttingen, and Paris.  He returned to Philadelphia and devoted himself to chemistry and mineralogy.  He was elected as a member of the American Philosophical Society in 1797 and a Fellow of the American Academy of Arts and Sciences in 1824.

Seybert was elected as a Democratic-Republican to the Eleventh Congress to fill the vacancy caused by the resignation of Benjamin Say.  He was reelected to the Twelfth and Thirteenth Congresses.  He was chairman of the United States House Committee on Revisal and Unfinished Business during the Twelfth Congress.  He was again elected to the Fifteenth Congress.  He visited Europe from 1819 to 1821 and again in 1824 and settled in Paris, France, where he died May 2, 1825.  He was interred at Laurel Hill Cemetery in Philadelphia.

Sources

The Political Graveyard

Alumni of the University of Edinburgh
1773 births
1825 deaths
Burials at Laurel Hill Cemetery (Philadelphia)
Fellows of the American Academy of Arts and Sciences
Politicians from Philadelphia
Members of the American Philosophical Society
Democratic-Republican Party members of the United States House of Representatives from Pennsylvania
Perelman School of Medicine at the University of Pennsylvania alumni